Roemheld or Römheld is a German surname. Notable people with the surname include:

Heinz Eric Roemheld (1901–1985), American composer
Volker Roemheld (1941–2013), German agricultural scientist, plant physiologist and soil biologist

See also
Roemheld syndrome, a complex of gastrocardiac symptoms

German-language surnames